Zaynab al-Ṣughrā, also known by her kunya Umm Kulthūm bint ʿAlī, was the granddaughter of Muhammad and the daughter of Alī ibn Abī Ṭālib, the fourth rāshidūn caliph (r. 656–661) and the first Shia Imam of Islam—cousin, son-in-law, and companion (ṣaḥāba) of Muhammad—through his marriage with Fāṭimah.

Whether or not she was married to the second rāshidūn caliph, ʿUmar ibn al-Khaṭṭāb (r. 634–644), is a disputed topic between the Sunnīs and some Twelver Shīʿa Muslims. She is given the epithet "the Younger" to distinguish her from her older sister, Zaynab the Elder (Zaynab al-Kubra).

Family
She was born around 6 AH as the fourth child of Ali and of Muhammad's daughter, Fatima. Her siblings were Hasan, Husayn and Zaynab al-Kubra. Muhammad gave her the kunya 'Umm Kulthum' because she closely resembled his daughter, Umm Kulthum bint Muhammad, Zaynab's maternal aunt.

First marriage

Sunni belief

Ali originally wanted his daughters to marry his brother Ja'far's sons, but Umm Kulthum's hand in marriage was requested by the Caliph, who promised, "No man on the face of the earth will treat her better than I will."

Ali protested that she had not yet reached puberty, but Umar commanded that she be presented to him. Ali gave his daughter a striped garment and instructed her: "Take this to the Commander of the Faithful and tell him: 'My father says, "If you like this garment, keep it; if you don't like it, return it."'" When Umm Kulthum brought this message to Umar, she reported, "He did not undo the garment nor look at anything except at me." He told her that he was pleased, and so Ali consented to the marriage. Umar gave his bride a dower of 40,000 dirhams, and the marriage was consummated in November or December 638 (Dhu'l-Qaada 17 AH).

They had two children, Zayd and Ruqayya. Ruqayya later married Ibrahim, a son of Sa'd ibn Abi Waqqas, by whom she had a daughter.
 
One story from their married life tells how Umm Kulthum sent a gift of perfume to the Empress of Byzantium. The Empress sent back a "superb" necklace for Umm Kulthum. Umar believed that his wife should not have conducted a private correspondence at the expense of the state postal service, so he reimbursed her for the cost of the perfume and placed the Empress's necklace in the state treasury. Nevertheless, it was said that Umar treated Umm Kulthum "with extreme honour and respect" because she was Muhammad's granddaughter.

Twelver Shia belief
However, much of Twelver Shiites believe that her marriage with Umar did not occur and she married Awn ibn Jafer(Ja'far) ibn Abi Talib, then (after his death) to his younger brother Muhammad.

Subsequent marriages 
After Umar's death in 644, Umm Kulthum married her young cousin, Ja'far's son Awn, for a dower of 4,000 dirhams. Her brother Hasan remarked that he had never seen such passionate love as Umm Kulthum's for Awn. However, Awn died after only a short time.

After Awn's death, Ali married Umm Kulthum to Awn's brother Muhammad, again for 4,000 dirhams. But Muhammad also died.

After the death of her husband Muhammad, Umm Kulthum became one of the wives of Awn and Muhammad's eldest brother, Abdullah, who had divorced her sister Zaynab al-Kubra.. With respect to divorce the book of Muhammad Al-Munajjid discloses that Zaynab died while married to him (Abdullah ibn Ja'far). Umm Kulthum remarked: "I was not shy with [my mother-in-law] Asma bint Umays. Two of her sons died while married to me, but I did not fear this for the third."

Umm Kulthum had no children by any of her three latter marriages.

Battle of Karbala
She is reported to have been present at the Battle of Karbala, during which her earrings were taken from her by an attacking soldier. Afterwards, Umm Kulthum is said to have given a eulogy condemning the people of Kufa for abandoning her brother Husayn, who was killed in the battle.

Death

Umm Kulthum and her son Zayd died at the same time, in Abdullah's lifetime. Eighty people attended their funeral, where Sa'id ibn al-'As conducted the prayers, and the congregation included Abdullah ibn Umar and Abu Hurairah.

Umm Kulthum is buried in Baab Sagheer cemetery in Damascus, Syria . The Mausoleum of Umm Kulthum is located in Arrawiya village in Damascus.

Fatimids believe that she is also known as "Zaynab the Younger" and that she is buried at Sayyidah Zaynab Mosque, Damascus; whereas Zaynab the Elder lived at the end of her life in Cairo and was buried there at Al-Sayeda Zainab Mosque.

See also
Family tree of Ali

Disputed issues in early Islamic history
Mashhad of Sayyida Ruqayya
Sunni view of Umar
Shia view of Umar

References

630 births
Children of Ali
Women companions of the Prophet
People from Medina
7th-century Arabs